Clara Deser is an American climate scientist. She is a senior scientist at the National Center for Atmospheric Research where she leads the Climate Analysis Section. Deser was elected to the United States National Academy of Sciences in 2021.

Early and personal life
Clara Deser was born to Polish-American theoretical physicist Stanley Deser and Swedish artist Elsbeth Deser. As a child, she loved mathematics and map making. She earned a B.S. in Earth and Planetary Sciences from MIT in 1982, and a Ph.D. in Atmospheric Sciences from the University of Washington in 1989 under the supervision of John Michael Wallace, with her dissertation entitled "Meteorological Characteristics of the El Nino--Southern Oscillation Phenomenon". She was a postdoctoral fellow with Maurice Blackmon at the Cooperative Institute for Environmental Sciences at the University of Colorado, and joined the National Center for Atmospheric Research in 1997.

Research
In 2016 Clara Deser had partnered with Benjamin Sanderson and used two existing sets of model simulations to investigate what future summers might look like. By using those models they predicted that the summers from 2061 to 2080 will be the hottest on record if the carbon emissions will continue to rise.

In 2018 she praised James Hansen's prediction on global temperature forecast calling it "incredible" and "astounding".

Honors
2017: Bjerknes Lecture, American Geophysical Union
2021: Member of the U. S. National Academy of Sciences.

References

External links

UCAR Homepage

20th-century births
Living people
American women scientists
National Center for Atmospheric Research faculty
Intergovernmental Panel on Climate Change contributing authors
Year of birth missing (living people)
American women academics
Members of the United States National Academy of Sciences
21st-century American women